Tom Stewart Lee (born April 8, 1941) is a senior United States district judge of the United States District Court for the Southern District of Mississippi.

Education and career

Born in Jackson, Mississippi, Lee received a Bachelor of Arts degree from Mississippi College in 1963 and a Juris Doctor from the University of Mississippi Law School in 1965. He was in the United States Army Reserve Captain, JAG Corps from 1965 to 1973. He was in private practice in Forest, Mississippi from 1965 to 1984. He was a prosecuting attorney of Scott County, Mississippi from 1968 to 1971. He was a judge of the Scott County Youth Court in Forest, Mississippi from 1979 to 1982. He was a Municipal judge, City of Forest, Mississippi in 1982.

Federal judicial service

Lee was nominated by President Ronald Reagan on May 15, 1984, to a seat on the United States District Court for the Southern District of Mississippi vacated by Judge Dan Monroe Russell Jr. He was confirmed by the United States Senate on June 11, 1984, and received his commission the same day. He served as Chief Judge from 1996 to 2003. He assumed senior status on April 8, 2006.

References

Sources
 

1941 births
Living people
Judges of the United States District Court for the Southern District of Mississippi
Mississippi College alumni
United States district court judges appointed by Ronald Reagan
20th-century American judges
United States Army officers
University of Mississippi School of Law alumni
People from Jackson, Mississippi
People from Forest, Mississippi
21st-century American judges